The East Timor Football Federation ( - FFTL) is the governing body of football in East Timor.

In 2016 Timor-Leste run their own league under supervision of and Secretary of State for Youth and Sport. The name of the league is Liga Futebol Amadora do Timor-Leste.

FFTL bodies

Executive committee

Players

Principal officials of FFTL

Chairmen 
 Francisco Kalbuadi Lay (2002-2007)   (2008-2018)
Pedro Carrascalao (2007-2008)Francisco MCP Jeronimo (2018-Present)''

Venues
 National Stadium, Dili
 Estadio Timor Soul, Baucau
 Estadio Malibaka Maliana, Bobonaro
 Estadio Gleno, Ermera 
 Estadio Manatuto, Manatuto

National teams

Currently, Timor Leste has the following football national teams:
 Timor-Leste national football team
 Timor-Leste national under-23 football team
 Timor-Leste national under-21 football team
 Timor-Leste national under-19 football team
 Timor-Leste national under-16 football team
 Timor-Leste women's national football team
 Timor-Leste women's national under-19 football team
 Timor-Leste women's national under-16 football team
 Timor-Leste national futsal team

Controversies and critics

Francisco Kalbuadi Lay corruption scandal 

The chairman of FFTL Francisco Kalbuadi Lay did not win the FFTL Presidential Race at the 2007 Extraordinary Congress; however, Kalbuadi continued his presidency until now. Pedro Carrascalao, who claimed he won the Presidential Race, had not worked at FFTL office since 2007. At 2007 Extraordinary Congress Carrascalao had 13 voting members who elected him as the President of FFTL. Carrascalao alleges that FFTL members were forced to call an Extraordinary Congress in 2007 after the organisation failed to hold a regular Congress – in which a Presidential vote would have been held – in the necessary timeframe. He says members were also greatly concerned about potential corruption within the organisation at the time.

General Secretary: Amandio Sarmento Scandal 

In February 2017, FIFA terminated and banned General Secretary Amandio Sarmento of FFTL. Sarmento was banned for three years of football activity. Furthermore, Sarmento was guilty of using falsified documents in connection with the fielding of ineligible players by Timor-Leste.

See also
 Liga Futebol Amadora

References

External links
 Timor-Leste at the FIFA website.
 Timor-Leste at the AFC website

Football in East Timor
East Timor
Football
FFTL
Sports organizations established in 2002
2002 establishments in East Timor